Haitians in France consist of migrants from Haiti and their descendants living in France.

Demographics                            
The 2011 Census recorded 62 298 Haitian-born people.

List of notable Haitians in France

Artists
Edgar Degas, artist
Edouard Duval-Carrié, painter and sculptor
Philippe Dodard, graphic artist and painter
Gérard Fombrun, sculptor

Athletes
Ronald Agénor, professional tennis player
Bryan Alceus, professional football player
Gary Ambroise, professional football player
Ernst Atis-Clotaire, professional football player
Jean-Kévin Augustin, professional football player
Hervé Bazile, professional football player
Kervens Belfort, professional football player
Jean-Ricner Bellegarde, professional football player
Frantz Bertin, professional football player
Davidson Charles, professional football player
Rochel Chery, professional basketball player
Yves Desmarets, professional football player
Belony Dumas, professional football player
Jean-Kévin Duverne, professional football player
Wagneau Eloi, professional football player
Gabriel Flambert, professional football player
Herby Fortunat, professional football player
Yassin Fortune, professional football player
Romain Genevois, professional football player
Marc Hérold Gracien, professional football player; was considered as the fastest player in France by beating Nicolas Anelka's record after a physical test at Clarefontaine (The National Institute of Soccer)
Constantin Henriquez, first person of color to compete in the Olympic Games and by extension to win a gold medal; rugby union footballer
Max Hilaire, professional football player
Lecsinel Jean-François, professional football player
Dominique Jean-Zéphirin, professional football player
Jean-Dimmy Jéoboam, professional basketball player
Georgi Joseph, professional basketball player
Steeven Joseph-Monrose, professional football player
Presnel Kimpembe, professional football player
Kevin Lafrance, professional football player
Alexandre Lippmann, fencer
Jeff Louis, professional football player
Mike Maignan, professional football player
Jean-Eudes Maurice, professional football player
Pierre Mercier, professional football player
Rénald Metelus, professional football player
Soni Mustivar, professional football player
Wilner Nazaire, professional football player
Ralph Noncent, professional football player
Windsor Noncent, professional football player
Vladimir Pascal, professional football player
Jean-Jacques Pierre, professional football player
Listner Pierre-Louis, professional football player
Johny Placide, professional football player
Yves Pons, professional basketball player
Dylan Saint-Louis, professional football player
Abel Thermeus, professional football player
William Vainqueur, professional football player
 Ronaël Pierre-Gabriel

Entertainment
Jeanne Duval, actress
Raoul Peck, filmmaker

Historical personalities
Eugene Bullard, first African-American military pilot, whose ancestors where Haitian slaves who fled the Haitian Revolution.
Charles Terres Weymann, racing pilot, who flew for Nieuport during World War I as a test pilot and was awarded the rank of Chevalier of the Legion of Honour.
Jean-Baptiste Belley, former slave from Saint Domingue
Joseph Philippe Lemercier Laroche, engineer and the only passenger of known African ancestry on the ill-fated voyage of the RMS Titanic.
Michèle Bennett, ex-wife of former President for Life of Haiti, Jean-Claude Duvalier.
Serge Gilles, exiled leader of the Fusion of Haitian Social Democrats political party of Haiti.

Literature
Alexandre Dumas, writer (most notable for works such as The Three Musketeers)
Alexandre Dumas, fils, writer and dramatist
Félix Morisseau-Leroy, writer
Gary Klang, poet and novelist
Ida Faubert, writer
Jacques Bins, comte de Saint-Victor, poet
Jacques Roumain, writer, politician, and advocate of Marxism
Jean-Baptiste Dureau de la Malle, writer and translator
Jean-Baptiste Romane, poet and one poem, Vers à la France, he was awarded a gold medallion by the French government
Jean Dominique, journalist
Joel Dreyfuss, journalist, editor, and writer
John James Audubon, ornithologist, naturalist, and painter
Maggy de Coster, writer
Paul Arcelin, writer
Pierre Faubert, poet and playwright
René Depestre, poet and former communist activist
Roger Gaillard, historian and novelist
Solon Ménos, author and politician
Thomas Madiou, historian
Victor Séjour, author

Medicine
 François Fournier de Pescay, first person of color to have practiced medicine and surgery in Europe.

Models
Misty Jean, former Miss West Indies and singer

Music
Célimène Daudet, pianist
Alibi Montana, rapper
Kery James, rapper and singer
Michel Paul Guy de Chabanon, violinist, composer and writer
Roi Heenok, rapper, producer and entrepreneur

Political figures
Alexandre Pétion
André Rigaud
Dumarsais Estimé
Franck Lavaud, military general and politician 
François-Ferdinand Christophe
Jean-Baptiste Mills
Jean-Claude Bajeux, political activist and professor of Caribbean literature
Joseph Bunel
Jules DeMun
Léon Thébaud, lawyer and ambassador
Lysius Salomon
Michaëlle Jean
Paul Arcelin, political activist
Philippe Kieffer, French officer and political personality, and a hero of the Free French Forces
Thomas-Alexandre Dumas
Toussaint Louverture

See also
 France–Haiti relations
 Haitian Canadian
 Haitian diaspora
 List of Haitians
 List of Haitian Americans

References       

Caribbean French
Society of France
 
Ethnic groups in France
Immigration to France by country of origin
France